Éxitos y Recuredos is a compilation album series that was first released in 1995 under the title Exitos del Recuerdo which spotlighted Selena. In 1996, the series changed the name to Exitos y Recuerdos spotlighting other artists of different Mexican music genres, mostly of Tejano music singers. The album was produced by EMI-Capitol Special Markets in the United States whereas Madacy Entertainment was produced in Canada.

Éxitos del Recuerdo 
Éxitos del Recuerdo, compilation album by Álvaro Torres (1995)
Éxitos del Recuerdo, compilation album by Daniela Romo (1995)
Éxitos del Recuerdo, compilation album by Dyango (1995)
Éxitos del Recuerdo, compilation album by Ednita Nazario (1995)
Éxitos del Recuerdo, compilation album by Mijares (1995)
Éxitos del Recuerdo, compilation album by Selena (1995)
Éxitos del Recuerdo de la Radio, compilation album by various of artists (2003)
Éxitos y Recuerdos, compilation album by Freddy Fender (2006)
Éxitos y Recuerdos, compilation album by José Feliciano (1997)
Éxitos y Recuerdos, compilation album by Selena (1996, 1997, 2006)
Éxitos y Recuerdos, compilation album by Yuri (1996)
Pandora: Éxitos y Recuerdos, compilation album by Pandora (1997)

Éxitos & Recuerdos 
Éxitos & Recuerdos, compilation album by Los Ángeles Negros (1996)
Éxitos & Recuerdos, compilation album by Daniela Romo (1996)
Éxitos & Recuerdos, compilation album by Eddie Santiago (1996)
Éxitos & Recuerdos, compilation album by Mazz (1996, 1997)
Éxitos & Recuerdos, compilation album by Mijares (1996)
Éxitos & Recuerdos, compilation album by Myriam Hernández (1996)
Éxitos & Recuerdos, compilation album by Paloma San Basilio (1996)

References

See also 
Fotos y Recuerdos

Compilation album series